Karl Joseph Aloys Agricola (18 October 1779 – 15 May 1852) was a German artist, noted for his portrait miniatures.

Life and works
Agricola was born at Bad Säckingen, Margraviate of Baden, in 1779. After a preliminary course of instruction in Karlsruhe, he went in 1798 to Vienna and enrolled the Academy, where he studied under Heinrich Füger.

He soon became known for his mythological pictures in oil and watercolour – such as his Cupid and Psyche – and for his etchings and lithographs; but he was most noted for his miniature portraits. After a prosperous career he died in Vienna in 1862.

He painted in the style of the end of the 18th century, and was an imitator of his teacher, Heinrich Füger. He made engraving after the works of Elzheimer, Raphael, Poussin, Parmigiano, Domenichino, Füger, and others.

References

Further reading
 
 
 
 Allgemeines Künstlerlexikon: die bildenden Künstler aller Zeiten und Völker. München: Saur, 1992- , Vol.1 (1997), pp. 569–570

External links

 

1779 births
1862 deaths
People from Bad Säckingen
People from the Margraviate of Baden
19th-century German painters
19th-century German male artists
German male painters
Academy of Fine Arts Vienna alumni